Ellevate Network (formerly 85 Broads) is a Global Community of women committed to fostering and promoting gender equality in the workplace.  The organization provides women and femme-identifying, non-binary individuals with a community to lean on and learn from through networking, online and offline education, inspiration, and opportunity. Founded in 1997 to bring high-achieving women in finance together, the network now serves women across industries and around the world. Its CEO is Maricella Herrera. 

As of December, 2019 the organization has a community of over 150,000 women across the globe and has over 40 chapters primarily in the United States, with international locations in Dubai, London, Madrid, and Toronto.

History 
Ellevate was founded in 1997 as 85 Broads by Janet Hanson. Hanson had formerly worked at Goldman Sachs and formed the organization as an alumnae network for women who had left the firm. The name came from the address of New York's Goldman Sachs office. 

Sallie Krawcheck, former head of global wealth management at Merrill Lynch, acquired 85 Broads Unlimited LLC in 2013 and rebranded the organization as Ellevate in 2014. When Krawcheck acquired the network, it was broadly accepted as a move "that could send a shock wave through the financial services sector." Krawcheck responded by underlining the importance of women's engagement in economy and cited the year 2013 as a "tipping point" for women in the workplace. Following Krawcheck's acquisition, Hanson stayed involved with the organization as Chairman Emeritus and as an advisor to Krawcheck. The organization's name derives from the French pronoun "elle", meaning "she" and Ellevate's core purpose of elevating women at work.

Services 
Ellevate Network hosts networking events around the world: Online webinars, online networking, and career advice on topics like creating a personal brand, growing a business, finding a mentor, reinventing your career, and finding balance and fulfillment. Ellevate Network also provides squads to professional women, an innovative online program that uses technology to help professional women get ahead in business by leveraging Ellevate’s community to lean on and learn from. Special events, opportunities, and advice are all available for young professionals, working mothers, entrepreneurs, and senior executives.

Partnerships 
On March 21, 2016 Ellevate announced a partnership with American Corporate Partners, a women's veteran mentoring program. In 2014, Ellevate partnered with Pax World Management to form the Pax Ellevate Global Women's Index Fund, a fund focused on companies with significant representation of women in director and officer positions.

References

External links 
 

Professional associations based in the United States
Professional associations for women
Professional networks
International women's organizations
Organizations established in 1997
1997 establishments in the United States
Computer networking

Feminist organizations in the United States
Women's organizations based in the United States